Love & Hip Hop is a media franchise that consists of several reality television series broadcast on VH1. The shows document the personal and professional lives of several hip hop and R&B recording artists, music executives and record producers residing in various metropolitan areas of the United States. The original franchise version, Love & Hip Hop: New York, premiered on March 6, 2011. Its success resulted in spin-offs based in Atlanta, Hollywood, and Miami.

The series is known for its large ensemble cast. Many are notable figures in hip hop and R&B, who appear in the opening credits as leading cast members. The franchise is also known for launching the careers of previously unknown artists, most notably K. Michelle and Cardi B. Each incarnation of the franchise features a sprawling supporting cast, credited as "additional cast" or "featured" in the show's end credits. These secondary cast members appear in green screen confessional segments and (for the most part) have the same amount of screen time and storyline focus as the show's main cast members.  Over the years, several supporting cast members have been upgraded to lead.

Several cast members have made crossover appearances on different incarnations throughout the show's history, most notably K. Michelle and Safaree Samuels, who both have had a starring role on Atlanta, New York and Hollywood. They are followed by Erica Mena and Yandy Smith-Harris, who have starred on both New York and Atlanta, and Joseline Hernandez, who has starred on both Atlanta and Miami.

The franchise's popularity has spawned the spin-off shows, Chrissy & Mr. Jones, K. Michelle: My Life, Stevie J & Joseline: Go Hollywood, Leave It to Stevie and Remy & Papoose: Meet the Mackies, as well as several television specials, an aftershow, a mobile game and an official podcast.

Cast timeline
  Main cast (receives star billing at some point in the series) 
  Secondary cast (appears in green screen confessional segments and in end credits alongside the main cast)
  Guest cast (appears in a guest role, cameo appearance or archive footage)

Note:

Related shows
 The VH1 reality shows The Gossip Game and This Is Hot 97, also produced by Monami Entertainment, were listed as spin-offs of Love & Hip Hop in a Complex profile of Mona Scott-Young, however they have never officially been considered as part of the franchise. 
 Joe Budden and Kaylin Garcia joined the cast of the sixth season of the VH1 show Couples Therapy, which premiered October 7, 2015.
 Jim Jones and Chrissy Lampkin starred on the WE TV show Jim & Chrissy: Vow or Never, which premiered September 1, 2016. Nancy "Mama" Jones would appear in a supporting role. 
 Ray J, Princess Love, Cardi B, Stevie J, Karlie Redd, Lil' Fizz, Yandy Smith, Mimi Faust, Safaree Samuels, Yung Joc, Jessica Dime, Remy Ma, Joseline Hernandez, Joe Budden, Trina, Papoose, Cyn Santana, Erica Mena and Nikki Mudarris have appeared on the VH1 game show Hip Hop Squares, which premiered March 13, 2017.
 Deb Antney is part of the cast of the WE TV show Growing Up Hip Hop: Atlanta, which premiered May 25, 2017. Jhonni Blaze and Masika Kalysha joined the cast in season two.
 Erica Mena, Yung Joc, Nikki Mudarris and Safaree Samuels were contestants on the VH1 reality competition show Scared Famous, which premiered October 23, 2017.
 Benzino, Althea Heart, Nikko London, Margeaux Simms, PreMadonna, Peter Gunz, Amina Buddafly, Tara Wallace, Jim Jones, Chrissy Lampkin, Nancy "Mama" Jones, Momma Dee and Ernest Bryant have all appeared on various incarnations of WE TV's Marriage Boot Camp: Reality Stars franchise. On December 7, 2018, WE TV announced Marriage Boot Camp: Hip Hop Edition, which will premiere in January 2019 and will exclusively feature cast members from Love & Hip Hop. The show's cast includes Waka Flocka Flame and Tammy Rivera, Soulja Boy and Nia Riley, Jessica Dime and Shawne Williams, Lil Mo and Karl Dargan and Lil' Fizz and Tiffany Campbell.

References

External links
 Love & Hip Hop: New York
 Love & Hip Hop: Atlanta
 Love & Hip Hop: Hollywood
 Love & Hip Hop: Miami

Love & Hip Hop
Love and Hip Hop
Participants in American reality television series